Floy Campbell (August 31, 1873, Weston, Missouri –August 27, 1945, Boulder, Colorado) was an American painter known for her landscape, still life, and portrait paintings. Campbell’s style was greatly influenced by French Impressionism and European Expressionism.

Life 
Floy Campbell was born in Weston, Missouri. A graduate of Central High School in Kansas City, MO, Campbell continued her education at Columbia University, the Kansas City Art Association and School of Design, Art Students League of New York, and the Académie Colarossi in Paris.  

Campbell moved back to Kansas City in 1896, where she opened her own artist studio and was hired as an art instructor at the Manual Training High School. Campbell was a member of the Kansas City Paint Club, the Kansas City Society of Artists, the Kansas City Art Club, Society of Women Artists in Paris, and the Boulder Artists Guild.

Campbell died in 1945 in Boulder, Colorado. She is buried at the Green Mountain Cemetery in Boulder.

References

External links 
 Artist clippings file is available at Jannes Library, Kansas City Art Institute, Kansas City, MO
Missouri Remembers Artist Portal

1873 births
1945 deaths
19th-century American painters
American women painters
People from Weston, Missouri
20th-century American painters
20th-century American women